"Oy Khodyt Son Kolo Vikon" is a Ukrainian lullaby. The title is usually translated into English as "The Dream Passes by the Windows".

The song is a traditional lullaby, composed of three verses in a minor tone. However, as it is a folk song, there are many popular versions of both the lyrics and the melody. The first recordings of the lyrics were made in the 19th century. In particular, in the almanac "Mermaid of the Dniester" in 1837 on page 35. There it is marked as "lelial". On page 65 of Nikolai Gatsuk's collection "Harvest of the Native Field", published in Moscow in 1857.

Lyrics

Ukrainian Lyrics (most popular version)

Ой ходить сон коло вікон,

А дрімота — коло плота.

Питається сон дрімоти:

— Де ж ми будем ночувати?

— Де хатонька теплесенька,

Де дитинка малесенька,—

Там ми будем ночувати,

І дитинку колиcати.

Ой на кота та воркота,

На дитину та й дрімота,

Котик буде воркотати,

Дитинонька буде спати.

Possible "Summertime" connection
When, after a performance, the Ukrainian-Canadian composer and singer Alexis Kochan was asked about the similarity of (the first line of) this lullaby and the melody of George Gershwin's aria Summertime (composed in December 1933), Kochan suggested that "Gershwin was deeply affected by the Ukrainian lullaby when he heard it sung by the Koshetz Ukrainian National Choir at Carnegie Hall in 1929 [1926?]."

References 

Ukrainian songs
Ukrainian children's songs
Ukrainian folk songs
Traditional children's songs